Cosette may refer to:

Cosette, a fictional character in the novel Les Misérables by Victor Hugo
Cosette Lee (1910 – 1976), Canadian actress
Cosette Simon (born 1953), American politician, mayor of Ft. Wayne, Indiana
915 Cosette, an S-type asteroid belonging to the Flora family of Main Belt asteroids
 Cosette, French "yé-yé" singer
Cosette (given name)